Golden Gate is a village in Wayne County, Illinois, along the Little Wabash River. The population was 65 at the 2020 census.

Geography

The town was built by the Leach family in the late 19th century. The township that surrounds the Golden Gate area is also known as Leach township after the Leach family. Golden Gate was built along the railroad tracks and the Little Wabash river for business needs.

Demographics

As of the census of 2000, there were 100 people, 39 households, and 28 families residing in the village. The racial makeup of the village was 100.00% White. Hispanic or Latino of any race were 4.00% of the population.

There were 39 households, out of which 43.6% had children under the age of 18 living with them, 64.1% were married couples living together, 7.7% had a female householder with no husband present, and 28.2% were non-families. 28.2% of all households were made up of individuals, and 10.3% had someone living alone who was 65 years of age or older. The average household size was 2.56 and the average family size was 3.11.

In the village, the population was spread out, with 30.0% under the age of 18, 6.0% from 18 to 24, 36.0% from 25 to 44, 18.0% from 45 to 64, and 10.0% who were 65 years of age or older. The median age was 34 years. For every 100 females, there were 108.3 males. For every 100 females age 18 and over, there were 94.4 males.

The median income for a household in the village was $21,250, and the median income for a family was $28,750. Males had a median income of $26,250 versus $23,500 for females. The per capita income for the village was $10,214. There were 12.5% of families and 19.2% of the population living below the poverty line, including 15.2% of under eighteens and 14.3% of those over 64.

References

Villages in Illinois
Villages in Wayne County, Illinois